The Hurt the Divine the Light is the debut EP by French metalcore band Betraying the Martyrs, released on 18 November 2009. It is the band's only release with vocalist Eddie Czaicki who left the band in mid-2010. The EP sold more than 2,000 copies in France alone.

The lyrics of the EP tells the story of Abram's transition in life to Abraham.

Track listing

Personnel 
Betraying the Martyrs
Eddie Czaicki – lead vocals
Fabien Clévy – lead guitar
Baptiste Vigier – rhythm guitar
Valentin Hauser – bass
Antoine Salin – drums
Victor Guillet – keyboards, clean vocals

Additional personnel
Stéphane Buriez – production, mixing
Sylvain Biguet – mastering
Pegaz Design – design
Steve Josch – cover photo, photography
Melchiore Ferradou – band photo

References 

Betraying the Martyrs albums
Self-released EPs
2009 debut EPs